Štefanov nad Oravou is a village and municipality in Tvrdošín District in the Žilina Region of northern Slovakia.

History
In historical records the village was first mentioned in 1355.

Geography
The municipality lies at an altitude of 570 metres (1,800 feet) and covers an area of 12.348 km² (7.67 mi²). It has a population of about 605 people.

External links
http://www.statistics.sk/mosmis/eng/run.html

Villages and municipalities in Tvrdošín District